Garudinia is a genus of moths in the subfamily Arctiinae first described by Frederic Moore in 1882.

Description
Palpi upturned, slender and not reaching the vertex of head. Antennae minutely ciliated. Forewing narrow with arched costa. Veins 3 and 4 stalked, vein 5 absent, vein 6 from angle of cell. Veins 7 and 8 stalked and vein 10 absent. Male with a patch of modified scales in the cell. Hindwings of male excised at apex, with vein 6 absent. Female with stalked veins 3 and 4, vein 5 from above angle of cell, stalked veins 6 and 7 and vein 8 from middle of cell. Forewings of male with a large costal fold and female with small of it.

Species
 Garudinia acornuta
 Garudinia bimaculata
 Garudinia biplagiata
 Garudinia conjuncta Kirti & Gill, 2008
 Garudinia latana
 Garudinia macrolatana
 Garudinia pseudolatana
 Garudinia pseudosimulana Kirti & Gill, 2008
 Garudinia simulana
 Garudinia successana
 Garudinia triangulata
 Garudinia truncata

References
Citations

Sources

 Kirti, J.S. & Gill, N.S. (2008). Journal of Asia-Pacific Entomology
 Moore (1882). The Lepidoptera of Ceylon 2(1): 59.

Cisthenina
Moth genera